Glyme may refer to:

 Any of the glycol ethers, a class of solvents, usually dimethoxyethane if not otherwise specified
 River Glyme, a river in Oxfordshire, England